Lactonitrile is the organic compound with the formula CH3CH(OH)CN.  It is an intermediate in the industrial production of ethyl lactate and lactic acid.  It is the cyanohydrin of acetaldehyde.  It is a colorless liquid, although degraded samples can appear yellow.

Synthesis and use
Lactonitrile is obtained by the addition of hydrogen cyanide to acetaldehyde.

Lactonitrile is used in making esters of lactic acid.

Regulations
Cyanohydrins are sources of highly toxic hydrogen cyanide.
The substance is classified as an extremely hazardous substance in the United States as defined in Section 302 of the U.S. Emergency Planning and Community Right-to-Know Act (42 U.S.C. 11002), and is subject to strict reporting requirements by facilities which produce, store, or use it in significant quantities.

References

Cyanohydrins